Breakout 2000 is a 1996 action video game developed by MP Games and published by Telegames for the Atari Jaguar. Part of the 2000 series by Atari Corporation, it is a remake of the arcade game Breakout (1976), and one of the last officially licensed releases for the platform. Featuring a similar premise, the player must destroy a layer of brick lines by repeatedly bouncing a ball spawned off a paddle into them and keep it in play. It modifies the gameplay of the original game, introducing a third-person perspective behind the paddle in a pseudo-3D playfield, power-ups, bonus levels, enemies, varying level designs, and multiplayer.

Breakout 2000 was the first Jaguar project by MP Games, an Indiana-based developer which had previously worked on productivity software for PC and WalZ, a Breakout-style game for Atari ST based on Arkanoid (1986). Mario Perdue, who acted as the game's lead programmer, had originally developed a Windows 3.1x version of WalZ, which went unreleased due to its similarity with Breakout and fear of lawsuit from Atari. He later approached Atari staffer J. Patton, who recommended Perdue to work with the Jaguar hardware and loaned him a development kit for the system. Perdue sent a copy of the unreleased Windows version of WalZ to people within Atari, who liked it and served as basis for the project. The game garnered average reception from critics.

Gameplay 

Breakout 2000 is a action game featuring a similar premise to Breakout (1976), where the player's main objective is to destroy a layer of brick lines from the playfield by repeatedly bouncing a ball spawned off a paddle into them and keep it in play, using the walls and paddle to eliminate the bricks. The game is divided into two modes to choose from at the main menu (2000 and Classic), each with their own gameplay settings. As with previous arcade remakes and updates on the Atari Jaguar such as Tempest 2000, Missile Command 3D, and Defender 2000, the game modifies and builds upon the gameplay of its original counterpart, introducing a third-person perspective behind the paddle in a pseudo-3D playfield, power-ups, enemies, varying level designs, and multiplayer. 

In the 2000 mode, the player must clear 50 levels, each divided into ten phases consisting of five rounds and one of two bonus rounds. The player has five balls to try clearing the playfield of bricks, each having a fixed point value depending on their color. The ball increases its speed at specific hit intervals and the paddle shrinks to half of its size if the ball touches the upper wall in a single-player session. During gameplay, power-ups are dropped by two of three types of drones that randomly appear on the playfield. These power-ups assist the player, ranging from speed increasers, multiplying the number of balls on-screen, equip the paddle with a plasma cannon, among others. The third drone type, Stingers, are enemies who shoot the paddle to break it if the player takes a determined number of hits. In two-player mode, the players' paddle are positioned at the bottom (1P) and top (2P) respectively, while the playfield's upper wall is replaced with a warped wall that allow the balls travel back and forth. The player can also enable a computer-controlled assistant for the second paddle.

Classic mode is a recreation of the original arcade game, where the player can choose between two gameplay options at the main menu before starting: "Catch" (where the paddle is capable of holding the ball) and "Breakthru" (where the ball breaks the bricks by moving through them). On each mode, failing in making the ball rebound from the paddle results in losing it and the game is over once all the balls are lost.

Development 

Breakout 2000 was the first Atari Jaguar project by MP Games, an Indiana-based developer initially established in 1991 under the name MP Graphics Systems. The company had previously worked on productivity software for PC like DynaCaDD and DynaDesigner as well as WalZ, a Breakout-style game for Atari ST based on Arkanoid (1986). It was produced by John Skruch and is officially considered part of Atari Corporation's 2000 series. Mario Perdue, who previously worked on WalZ and projects for the ST and Atari TT030 computers, acted as lead programmer with Richard Degler providing additional programming, while T. Gary Degler was responsible for the artwork and cover illustration. Perdue recounted the game's creation and history in a 2018 interview.

Perdue originally programmed a Windows 3.1x version of WalZ, which was never released due to its similarity with Breakout and fear of lawsuit from Atari. He had health issues in the early 1990s but later recovered and approached Atari staffer J. Patton, who recommended Perdue to work with the Jaguar hardware and loaned him a development kit for the system. Perdue sent a copy of the unreleased Windows version of WalZ to people within Atari, who liked the game and decided "it was worth pursuing", serving as basis for Breakout 2000. 

Perdue received full freedom during development, receiving possible ideas to implemented in Breakout 2000 that were contributed into the final version from Patton and other Atari staffers like Bill Rehbock and Mike Fulton. Perdue tried to make the classic mode as close to the original game as possible, while also focusing on making the 2000 mode playable with the Jaguar's controller but found it difficult. Perdue stated that there were plans to include support for rotary controls, but were scrapped due to lack of them on the console.

Release 
Breakout 2000 was first previewed in 1995, being advertised with a September release date. It was covered by the press that were invited to Atari Corporations European division, featured in a promotional recording sent by Atari to video game retail stores on October 9, and showcased during an event hosted by Atari dubbed "Fun 'n' Games Day" between 1995 and 1996. Early previews prior to release showcased several differences compared to the final version such as different visuals and heads-up display. The game was later scheduled for a November launch window, although internal documentation from Atari showed that it was still in development by December 11. 

In 1996, Atari merged with JTS Corporation, ceasing production of the Atari Jaguar and games that were in development for the platform. This resulted in the game not being published by Atari despite being completed, rated by the ESRB, and scheduled for a July release. As part of the merger, Atari agreed to continue support for the Jaguar. Telegames later became involved with the game and sub-licensed it from Atari along with a number of titles for the console. By this time, Telegames was the last remaining software publisher for the Jaguar. Breakout 2000 was released in North America and Europe on December 10 (although some sources list December 9). Being a late release after the console was discontinued, it was only available through direct order from Telegames' US and UK websites as well as retailers or distributors such as Electronics Boutique.

Reception 

Breakout 2000 garnered average reception from critics. Edge felt that the game's main mode provided little gameplay "thrills" compared with Arkanoid (1986). The Atari Times Patrick Holstine labelled it as a well-done title, noting the challenging gameplay and adequate controls. However, Holstine found the graphical presentation "rather 16-bit looking". He also expressed mixed thoughts about the music and the classic mode. Marc Abramson of the French ST Magazine highlighted its visuals, sound, fluidity, and controls. Abramson also noted the multiplayer component for its originality but difficult in getting used to it due to the playfield's perspective, and lamented the lack of game save support. Red of German publication ST-Computer concurred with Abramson regarding the two-player mode, while commenting that the game's perspective was reminiscent of Klax. Red ultimately considered it a fun game, commending the gameplay, smooth animation, and controls, but felt that its audio "leaves a lot to be desired."

GamePros Dan Elektro echoed a similar opinion in regards to the graphics and controls, but found the power-ups difficult to distinguish before grabbing them and criticized the audio department. Regardless, Elektro concluded by stating: "The original Breakout (included on this cart) was great in its day, and Breakout 2000 is good now for two players, offering low-key, broad-appeal fun." MyAtaris Robert Jung gave the game positive remarks for the inclusion of the original title and multiplayer mode. While Jung found its controls passable, he saw the slower pacing and uninspired audiovisual presentation as negative points. Atari Gaming Headquarters Keita Iida regarded the game to be "a decent deviation from its predecessor", but faulted its controls for being sluggish in contrast to other reviewers. Author Andy Slaven agreed with Iida, writing that the Jaguar's pad cannot emulate the precise movement of a paddle, while also commenting that the pseudo-3D visuals failed to impress. Nils Nils of German website neXGam gave the title a mixed retrospective outlook.

Legacy 
After finishing development on Breakout 2000, Mario Perdue began work on three other games that were intended to be used on kiddie rides manufactured by Carousel Entertainment, using Jaguar consoles purchased from Atari as their control units across establishments such as K-Mart and Chuck E. Cheese: the racing game Speedster II, the helicopter-themed shoot 'em up Skycopter II, and a spaceship game titled SpaceGuy. According to Perdue, Speedster II was completed on December 5, 1996, while Skycopter II was completed shortly after but SpaceGuy was never released. There are conflicting reports online regarding status of the two finished titles, with one source stating the rides were released to the public while another source state they were never released due to issues with the system's reliability on certain environments.

MP Games would be renamed in 1997 to MP Interactive and then to L4 Software. In 2008, the source code of Breakout 2000 was released by hobbyist community Jaguar Sector II under a CD compilation for PC called Jaguar Source Code Collection. In 2011, Beta Phase Games alongside GOAT Store acquired the rights to both Speedster II and Skycopter II, in addition of purchasing all of their remaining Jaguar-related inventory from Carousel Entertainment. Perdue would later work on games for iOS such as Grid Hunt and WalZ Arena before retiring from game development. In 2022, a prototype ROM image of Speedster II was leaked online.

References

External links 

 
 Breakout 2000 at AtariAge
 Breakout 2000 at GameFAQs
 Breakout 2000 at MobyGames

1996 video games
Atari Jaguar games
Atari Jaguar-only games
Commercial video games with freely available source code
Multiplayer and single-player video games
Paddle-and-ball video games
Telegames games
Video game compilations
Video game remakes
Video games developed in the United States